Eastern short-toed lark may refer to:
 Mongolian short-toed lark, Calandrella dukhunensis
 The steppe subspecies of the greater short-toed lark,  Calandrella brachydactyla longipennis
 Asian short-toed lark, Alaudala cheleensis